Brendon James Egan (born 17 December 1984, in Christchurch, New Zealand) is a New Zealand sports writer for The Press newspaper in Christchurch.

His main rounds are netball, basketball, and cricket.

At the start of 2013, Egan travelled to the United States as a scholarship recipient of the Bell Journalism Prize. He was also named as one of two winners of the Sir John Wells Sports Journalism Scholarship, which was announced at the 2012 Sir Terry McLean sports journalism awards.

In 2010, Egan was named the National Basketball League's writer of the year and was a finalist in the young sports writer of the year award at the Sir Terry McLean sports journalism awards in Auckland.

Egan is a graduate of the University of Canterbury where he achieved a Bachelor of Arts honours degree in English and Mass Communication. He also completed a post-graduate diploma in Journalism through the University of Canterbury.

He began his sports journalism career at The Oamaru Mail, where he worked from 2008 to midway through 2009. From 2009 to December 2012, he wrote for The Southland Times, where he covered the Southern Steel and Southland Sharks professional teams.

Egan is an old boy of St Bede's College in Christchurch.

References

1984 births
Living people
People from Christchurch
New Zealand sportswriters
University of Canterbury alumni
People educated at St Bede's College, Christchurch